"Jimmy Cooks" is a song by Canadian rapper Drake featuring Atlanta-based rapper 21 Savage. It was released on June 17, 2022, from Drake's seventh studio album Honestly, Nevermind. The song is the only track from the album to have a guest appearance, and was dubbed a standout track by HotNewHipHop.

Four months prior to its official release as a single, "Jimmy Cooks" debuted at number one on the US Billboard Hot 100, becoming Drake's eleventh and 21 Savage's second number-one hit on the chart. Later, the song impacted contemporary hit radio on October 11, as the album's third single.

Music video
The accompanying music video was released on October 23 and served as an announcement of the two rappers' collaborative album Her Loss, which was released on November 4.

Composition
Generally, the song gives an insight into Drake's "professional journey" and makes reference to his former career in acting. Sound of the song was described as "Memphis-flavored" and was noted for its "rare" rap elements on an album full of dance songs. References include NBA duo Shaquille O'Neal and the late Kobe Bryant, as well as the slapping incident of Will Smith and Chris Rock at the 94th Academy Awards. The rappers also pay homage to the late artists Lil Keed and DJ Kay Slay. The song's title is inspired by his Degrassi: The Next Generation character, Jimmy Brooks.

Critical reception
Justin Curto at Vulture praised Drake's performance for reaching "just about full crooner mode here", while 21 Savage's appearance elevated the song to making it "the most high-energy, lucid moment of the record". Armon Sadler of Uproxx thought the song was "seemingly a part two to Certified Lover Boys "Knife Talk"" and described the track as "equal parts fun, cocky, and hype, commonplace for the two rappers listed". Billboards Michael Saponara called it the best song on Honestly, Nevermind, pointing out that Drake "had to remind listeners he's at the top of the food chain in the rap game by saving the best for last".

Charts

Weekly charts

Year-end charts

Certifications

Release history

References

2022 singles
2022 songs
21 Savage songs
Billboard Hot 100 number-one singles
Canadian Hot 100 number-one singles
Drake (musician) songs
Song recordings produced by Cubeatz
Song recordings produced by Tay Keith
Songs written by 21 Savage
Songs written by Drake (musician)
Songs written by Kevin Gomringer
Songs written by Tim Gomringer
Songs written by Tay Keith
Songs written by Vinylz
Song recordings produced by Vinylz
Republic Records singles
OVO Sound singles